Hans Peters (23 July 1894 – 29 September 1976) was an English art director. He was nominated for five Academy Awards in the category Best Art Direction. In 1944 he joined Metro-Goldwyn-Mayer and in 1959, he became assistant to George Davis, the studio's new supervising art director.

Selected filmography
 Nancy Steele Is Missing! (1937)
 The Picture of Dorian Gray (1945)
 The Red Danube (1949)
 Knights of the Round Table (1953)
 Lust for Life (1956)
 The Americanization of Emily (1964)

References

External links

English art directors
1894 births
1976 deaths
Artists from London